Relucio is a Spanish surname. Notable people with the surname include:
Charmaine Clarice Relucio Pempengco (born 1992), Filipino singer and television personality
José María Relucio Gallego (born 1998), Spanish footballer
José Vaquerizo Relucio (born 1978), Spanish boccia player
Natividad Relucio-Clavano (1932–2007), Filipina pediatrician

Spanish-language surnames